Philip William may refer to:

 Philip William, Prince of Orange (1554–1618), Prince of Orange and Knight of the Golden Fleece
 Philip William, Elector Palatine (1615–1690), Count Palatine of Neuburg, Duke of Jülich and Berg, Elector of the Palatinate
 Philip William, Margrave of Brandenburg-Schwedt (1669–1711), Prussian Prince, governor of Magdeburg